His Dark Materials is a fantasy drama television series based on the trilogy of novels of the same name by Philip Pullman. It is produced by Bad Wolf and New Line Productions, for BBC One and HBO, with the latter handling international distribution. The show follows the orphan Lyra, played by Dafne Keen, as she searches for a missing friend and discovers a kidnapping plot related to an invisible cosmic substance called Dust.

The eight-episode first series premiered on 3 November 2019 on BBC One in the United Kingdom, and on 4 November on HBO in the United States and other markets. The seven-episode second series premiered on 8 November 2020 in the UK, and on 16 November 2020 in the US. The eight-episode third and final series premiered first on HBO on 5 December 2022, and on 18 December 2022 in the UK. All three series received generally positive reviews.

Premise
His Dark Materials is set in a multi-world reality, with the action moving from one world to another. The series is based on Philip Pullman's trilogy of the same name. It begins in an alternative world where all humans' souls manifest as animal companions called daemons. The series follows the life of a young girl named Lyra who is an orphan living with the scholars at Jordan College, Oxford, in a world governed by the Magisterium, a religious and political body. Lyra discovers a dangerous secret that involves Lord Asriel and Marisa Coulter, and is the subject of a witches' prophecy that she will change the world. In her search for a missing friend, Lyra also uncovers a series of kidnappings and a link to a mysterious substance called Dust, which leads her on a journey of epic proportions and ultimately to other worlds. The witches' prophecy also links Lyra's destiny to Will Parry, a teenager from the conventional world, who is himself being pursued by figures connected to his long-lost father.

Cast

Main

 Dafne Keen as Lyra Belacqua (later known as Lyra Silvertongue), a girl who was raised at Jordan College.
 Amir Wilson as Will Parry, a secondary school student from Oxford, whose father disappeared 13 years previously.
 Ruth Wilson as Marisa Coulter, a powerful figure at the Magisterium who is Lyra's mother.
 Anne-Marie Duff as Maggie "Ma" Costa, a Gyptian woman who previously nursed Lyra. (series 1)
 Clarke Peters as The Master of Jordan College. (series 1)
 James Cosmo as Farder Coram van Texel, an elderly Gyptian and Serafina's former lover. (series 1)
 Ariyon Bakare as Lord Carlo Boreal, an authoritative figure at the Magisterium who crosses between two worlds. In Will's world, he is known as Sir Charles Latrom. (series 1–2)
 Will Keen as Father Hugh MacPhail (later Cardinal and Father President), a Magisterium official.
 Lucian Msamati as Lord John Faa, of the Western Gyptians. (series 1)
 Gary Lewis as Thorold, Asriel's assistant. (series 1–2)
 Lewin Lloyd as Roger Parslow, a kitchen boy who is Lyra's best friend. (series 1 and 3; guest series 2)
 Daniel Frogson as Tony Costa, Ma Costa's elder son. (series 1)
 Lin-Manuel Miranda as Lee Scoresby, an aeronaut. (series 1–2; featured series 3)
 Ruta Gedmintas as Serafina Pekkala, a witch who is the Queen of the Lake Enara witches, and Coram's former lover.
 Nina Sosanya as Elaine Parry, Will's sick mother. (series 1; featured series 2; guest series 3)
 Jade Anouka as Ruta Skadi, a witch queen and a former lover of Lord Asriel. (series 2–3)
 Sean Gilder as Father Graves, a member of the Magisterium. (series 2)
 Simone Kirby as Dr Mary Malone, a physicist from Will's world. (series 2–3)
 Andrew Scott as Colonel John Parry, a marine and explorer who is Will's father. In Lyra's world, he is known as a shaman named Stanislaus Grumman. (series 2; featured series 3; guest series 1)
 Adewale Akinnuoye-Agbaje as Ogunwe, a resistance fighter who Lord Asriel recruits. (series 3)
 Jonathan Aris as Commander Roke, an inches-tall Gallivespian who works as Lord Asriel's spy. (series 3)
 Chipo Chung as Xaphania, an angel allied with Lord Asriel. (series 3)
 Kobna Holdbrook-Smith as Balthamos, an angel who seeks Will to recruit him to Lord Asriel's cause. (series 3)
 Jamie Ward as Father Gomez, a member of the Magisterium. (series 3)
 James McAvoy as Lord Asriel Belacqua, a scholar and explorer who is Lyra's father, and leads the resistance against the Authority. (series 3; featured series 1; guest series 2)
 Sian Clifford as Agent Salmakia, a Gallivespian spy. (series 3)
 Alex Hassell as Metatron, the Authority's regent. (series 3)

Featured
The following actors are credited in the opening titles of up to two episodes in a series.

 Georgina Campbell as Adele Starminster, a reporter. (series 1)
 Lia Williams as Dr Cooper, a Magisterium scientist operating at Bolvangar, and later in Geneva. (series 1 and 3)
 Terence Stamp as Giacomo Paradisi, the bearer of the subtle knife residing in Cittàgazze. (series 2)
 Simon Harrison as Baruch, Balthamos' companion. (series 3)
 Amber Fitzgerald-Woolfe as Ama, a deaf girl who brings supplies to Mrs Coulter while she is in hiding. (series 3)

Voice cast

 Helen McCrory (series 1–2) and Victoria Hamilton (series 3) as Stelmaria, Asriel's daemon.
 Kit Connor as Pantalaimon, Lyra's daemon
 Eloise Little as Salcilia, Roger's daemon (series 1)
 Phoebe Scholfield as Alicia, the Master's daemon (series 1)
 Libby Rodliffe as Lyuba, Tony Costa's daemon (series 1)
 Cristela Alonzo as Hester, Lee Scoresby's daemon (series 1–2)
 David Suchet as Kaisa, Serafina Pekkala's daemon
 Joe Tandberg as Iorek Byrnison (voice and motion-capture), an armoured bear.
 Peter Serafinowicz (voice) and Joi Johannsson (motion-capture) as Iofur Raknison (series 1)
 Sope Dirisu as Sergi, Ruta Skadi's daemon (series 2–3)
 Sophie Okonedo as Xaphania (series 2)
 Lindsay Duncan as Octavia, Father MacPhail's daemon (series 2–3)
 Phoebe Waller-Bridge as Sayan Kötör, John Parry's daemon (series 2)
 Kate Ashfield as Atal, a Mulefa (series 3)
 Emma Tate as Gracious Wings and her fellow harpies who guard the Land of the Dead (series 3)
 Patricia Allison as Kirjava, Will's daemon (series 3)
 Tuppence Middleton as Father Gomez's daemon (series 3)

Additionally, lead puppeteer Brian Fisher provides the uncredited vocalisations for Mrs Coulter's golden lion tamarin daemon.

Recurring
 Simon Manyonda as Benjamin de Ruyter (series 1)
 Geoff Bell as Jack Verhoeven (series 1)
 Tyler Howitt as Billy Costa, a Gyptian boy captured by the Gobblers and Ma Costa's younger son. (series 1)
 Mat Fraser as Raymond van Gerrit (series 1)
 Ian Peck as Cardinal Sturrock, the head of the Magisterium. (series 1–2)
 David Langham as Father Garret
 Robert Emms as Thomas, an agent working for Boreal who spies on Will's family. (series 1)
 Morfydd Clark as Sister Clara (series 1)
 Frank Bourke as Fra Pavel Rasek, a representative and alethiometrist of the Consistorial Court of Discipline.
 Jamie Wilkes as Inspector Walters, "the pale-faced man" and an associate of Boreal and Thomas. (series 1–2)
 Ray Fearon as Mr Hanway, Will's school boxing coach. (series 1; guest series 2)
 Remmie Milner as Lena Feldt, a witch who accompanies Serafina in finding Lyra. (series 2)
 Bella Ramsey as Angelica, a girl living in Cittàgazze. (series 2)
 Ella Schrey-Yeats as Paola, Angelica's sister. She is a female version of Paolo from the book. (series 2)
 Sasha Frost as Reina Miti, a witch who accompanies Serafina in finding Lyra. (series 2)
 Lewis MacDougall as Tullio, a boy living in Cittàgazze who stole the Subtle Knife and is the brother of Angelica and Paola. (series 2)
 Lauren Grace as Joseph, a young woman in Ogunwe's army who remains in his world and encounters Mary. (series 3)
 Sorcha Groundsell as Maddy, Joseph's sister who remains with her in Ogunwe's world. (series 3)
 Wade Briggs as Alarbus, an archangel who is captured by Asriel. (series 3)
 Peter Wight as the boatman who takes Lyra and Will to the Land of the Dead. (series 3)

Episodes

Series 1 (2019)

Series 2 (2020)

Series 3 (2022)

Production

Development
The three His Dark Materials novels, written by Philip Pullman from 1995 to 2000, achieved critical and commercial success and were adapted into a 2007 feature film, The Golden Compass. The film was criticised by both religious organisations, who objected to the story's anti-religious elements, as well as by fans of the trilogy who disliked the dilution of these elements. Despite earning $372 million worldwide, the film underperformed at the box office in North America, making any sequels unlikely.

After several years, the rights reverted to Pullman. In November 2015, BBC One announced that it had commissioned a television adaptation of the trilogy, to be produced by Bad Wolf and New Line Cinema. The eight-part adaptation had a planned premiere date in 2017. In April 2017 writer Jack Thorne told Radio Times that the series was still in pre-production. He said, "It's at an exciting point where we're just throwing things at the page and trying to work out what works and what doesn't", and that he wanted to ensure that they were being loyal to the books. Director Otto Bathurst explained that some elements of the book and film had been changed to give the series a more modern feel, compared to the original's Victoriana fantasy.

On 12 September 2018, HBO was announced as the co-producer and international distributor of the series. On 10 October 2018, Miranda reported that he had wrapped up filming for his role. On 14 December 2018, it was announced that filming for the first series was complete.

Before the series premiered, it was renewed for a second series of eight episodes,  primarily adapting the second book in the trilogy, The Subtle Knife. Filming of the second series began before the premiere of the first, which was considered "a necessary move considering the age of the show's young star". While filming for series 2 was mostly completed before the COVID-19 pandemic, a standalone episode focusing on Lord Asriel was left unfinished. As a consequence the series ultimately only consisted of seven episodes. Although McAvoy completed a small amount of filming before production was shut down, his appearance in the second series' final episode was filmed during the pandemic, repurposed from material written for the abandoned episode.

By November 2020, work had begun on six of eight scripts for a third series adapting The Amber Spyglass. The commission was confirmed in December 2020, for a series of eight episodes, and production began in early 2021. Filming for the third series took place between 24 May and 31 October 2021.

Casting

On 8 March 2018, it was announced that Dafne Keen had signed on to star in the series to play Lyra with director Tom Hooper signed on to direct. Lin-Manuel Miranda would star as Lee Scoresby. On 8 June 2018, it was reported that James McAvoy, Clarke Peters, and Ruth Wilson had joined the cast.

On 27 July 2018, the BBC and Bad Wolf revealed the cast and crew for the series.

On 1 July 2020, it was revealed that Bella Ramsey had been cast in the role of Angelica in series 2.

Additional casting for the third series was announced on 22 June 2021, including Adewale Akinnuoye-Agbaje as Commander Ogunwe, Jamie Ward as Father Gomez, Kobna Holdbrook-Smith as Balthamos, Simon Harrison as Baruch, and Amber Fitzgerald-Woolfe as Ama. Chipo Chung was also reported as playing the angel Xaphania, who was voiced by Sophie Okonedo in series 2.

On 20 September 2021, it was announced that Sian Clifford and Jonathan Aris had been cast in series 3.

Music
On 14 August 2019, it was announced that Lorne Balfe was hired to score the series. Speaking about the job, Balfe stated that he "wanted to write a musical letter to the creators of the show", also mentioning that the series was a "mammoth task" and one of his biggest projects yet. Scoring primarily took place in St David's Hall in Cardiff, Wales with the BBC National Orchestra of Wales, while the ethnic Bulgarian choir was recorded in Bulgaria with additional remote sessions taking place at the Synchron Scoring Stage in Vienna, Austria with the Synchron Stage Orchestra. Also featured on the score are cellist Tina Guo, Red Hot Chili Peppers drummer Chad Smith, classical French horn player Sarah Willis, violinist Lindsey Stirling, and recordist Richard Harvey. Two soundtrack albums were released: a musical anthology with thematic pieces and an album containing all the cues used in the series. Silva Screen Records released the albums digitally on 3 November 2019 and 20 December 2019 respectively.

Lorne Balfe's His Dark Materials score was nominated for two awards: for Best Original Score for a Television Series at the 2020 International Film Music Critics Association (IFMCA) awards and for Music – Original Title at the 2020 Royal Television Society awards.

Release
On 24 July 2019, it was announced that the series would premiere in the fourth quarter of 2019 in the UK and the US. On 12 September 2019, sources revealed that the series was set to premiere on 3 November 2019 on BBC One and the following night on HBO. In New Zealand, the series is broadcast by Sky TV and is available on streaming service Neon. The series began on 5 November 2019. In Australia, the series is distributed by the cable and satellite television company Foxtel through their HBO output deal.

The second series premiered on 8 November 2020 in the UK, and on 16 November 2020 in the US. The third series premiered on HBO on 5 December 2022, and premiered in the UK on 18 December 2022, with the series being released in full on BBC iPlayer, and airing weekly on BBC One.

Reception

Critical response

Series 1
Series one received positive reviews from critics. On Rotten Tomatoes, the first series has an approval rating of 77% based on reviews from 114 critics, with an average rating of 6.99/10. The website's critical consensus reads: "The daemon is in the details and while His Dark Materials visual splendor and exceptional performances deftly capture the essence of Philip Pullman's seminal novels, it could use a little more magic." On Metacritic, the series has a score of 69 out of 100 based on reviews from 22 critics, indicating "generally favorable reviews".

Dan Fienberg of The Hollywood Reporter wrote that "this effort nails much of what makes the books pop, and both the special effects and a star-studded cast led by Dafne Keen and Ruth Wilson are in fine form." However, he followed that by saying "What never fully worked for me in the four episodes... sent to critics is the necessary feeling of narrative and thematic momentum. It's vastly better than the movie, but neither fun nor smart enough to quite succeed." Caroline Framke of Variety wrote: "Despite the rich complexities of the novel's world of daemons, power-hungry players and warring faiths, HBO's His Dark Materials feels like it could have been plucked from most any other fantasy epic out there." Beth Elderkin of Gizmodo was critical of the show's inability to capture the connection between humans and daemons.

Ben Lawrence of The Telegraph gave the first episode 4 out of 5 stars, calling it "a fine piece of drama, capturing the strangeness and childlike wonder of the books, but also their rigour and bite. This is intelligent populism writ large." Huw Fullerton of the Radio Times gave the first episode a positive review: "While there is a slight element of table-setting in the series' first hour the appeal of the actors and setting are beguiling enough to pull you through all the exposition and explanation." Fullerton praised Wilson for her performance, saying she "nearly walks away with the whole series". David Levesley of British GQ wrote that His Dark Materials as a whole illustrates the fundamental problem with remaking adaptations: "the execution doesn't feel far enough removed from the previous version to actually make for a significantly better product".

Series 2
Series two received generally positive reviews from critics. On Rotten Tomatoes, the second series has an approval rating of 85% based on reviews from 33 critics, with an average rating of 6.87/10. The website's critical consensus reads: "His Dark Materials chilly emotional core and imposing complexity is unlikely to win over the unconverted, but its sophomore season rewards the faithful with impeccable production values and cerebral thrills." On Metacritic, series 2 has a score of 71 out of 100 based on reviews from 4 critics, indicating "generally favorable reviews".

Stuart Jeffries of The Guardian praised the series and in particular the villainous Mrs. Coulter, calling Pullman's creation a compelling monster, and that writer Jack Thorne clearly "revels in punching up Coulter as a combination of Iago and Lady Macbeth with a hint, at her most pantomimic, of Cruella de Vil" and "you never know what she might do next". Jeffries was critical of the musical score, comparing it to "The Boy Who Cried Wolf", leaving audiences in doubt if the next dramatic moment was quite as significant as the music was suggesting, and undermining the two good lead actors who convey the necessary dramatic tension in their performances. Ed Cumming of The Independent wrote: "His Dark Materials looks great, it's robustly made, and there are great actors everywhere, occupying well-built universes. But it doesn't inspire as much wonder as it ought to." Ed Power of The Irish Times was critical of the series. Despite the strong cast, he called it "slow-moving and inhospitable towards newcomers" and plodding in its execution. Power blamed Pullman's source material: "frankly the whole thing is a bit of a drag. It's never fun being preached to, not even by an atheist." He concludes "His Dark Materials has a lot going for it. But it desperately lacks a sense of fun and, crucial for fantasy, the promise of escapism."

Series 3
Series three received generally positive reviews from critics. On Rotten Tomatoes, the final series has an approval rating of 90% based on reviews from 21 critics, with an average rating of 7.30/10. The website's critical consensus reads: "In perhaps its most stirring season, the final installment of His Dark Materials rewards its viewers with a heart-wrenching conclusion befitting this faithful adaptation." Stuart Jeffries of The Guardian gave it four out of five stars, praising the performances and visual effects.

Accolades

|-
| rowspan="8" align="center"| 2020
| Annie Awards
| Outstanding Achievement for Character Animation in an Animated Television/Broadcast Production
| Aulo Licinio
| 
| 
|-
| rowspan="5"| British Academy Television Awards
| Best Costume Design
| Caroline McCall
| 
| 
|-
| Best Photography & Lighting: Fiction
| Suzie Lavelle
| 
| 
|-
| Best Sound: Fiction
| Dillon Bennett, Jon Thomas, Gareth Bull and James Ridgeway
| 
| 
|-
| Best Special, Visual & Graphic Effects
| Framestore, Painting Practice, Real SFX and Russel Dodgson
| 
| 
|-
| Titles & Graphic Identity
| Elastic, Painting Practice
| 
| 
|-
| Satellite Awards
| Best Television Series – Genre
| His Dark Materials
| 
| 
|-
| Visual Effects Society Awards
| Outstanding Visual Effects in a Photoreal Episode
| Russell Dodgson, James Whitlam, Shawn Hillier and Robert Harrington
| 
| 
|-
| rowspan="2" align="center"| 2021
| Satellite Awards
| Best Television Series – Genre
| His Dark Materials
| 
| 
|-
| Saturn Awards
| Best Television Presentation (under 10 Episodes)
| His Dark Materials
| 
| 
|}

Notes

References

External links
 
 
 
 

2019 American television series debuts
2022 American television series endings
2010s American children's television series
2010s American drama television series
2020s American children's television series
2020s American drama television series
2019 British television series debuts
2023 British television series endings
2010s British children's television series
2010s British drama television series
2020s British children's television series
2020s British drama television series
American children's fantasy television series
Annie Award winners
BBC television dramas
British children's fantasy television series
Dark fantasy television series
English-language television shows
HBO original programming
High fantasy television series
His Dark Materials
Science fantasy television series
Serial drama television series
Television about magic
Television series about orphans
Television series about teenagers
Television series about parallel universes
Television shows based on British novels
Television series by BBC Studios
Television series by Home Box Office
Television shows filmed in the United Kingdom
Witchcraft in television